This page is a list of heirs to the throne of Luxembourg. The list includes all individuals who were considered to inherit the throne of Luxembourg, either as heir apparent or as heir presumptive, since the constitution of the Grand Duchy of Luxembourg on 15 March 1815. Those who actually succeeded as Grand Duke or Grand Duchess of Luxembourg are shown in bold.

The Grand Duchy of Luxembourg was created in 1815 by the Congress of Vienna and given to the new King of the United Kingdom of the Netherlands in exchange for his ancestral Principality of Orange-Nassau, which went to Prussia; as a result, the first Grand Dukes of Luxembourg were Dutch kings also, and their heirs were eligible for both thrones. This union began to crack in 1884, when the last son of the King-Grand Duke died, leaving no male heir in the Orange-Nassau line. While the King's daughter Wilhelmina could (and would) inherit the Dutch throne, Luxembourg, a "German" territory, followed the Nassau Family Pact of 1783, wherein Salic law (barring females from inheriting) applied. Instead, the throne passed to the only remaining branch of the Nassau family, the House of Nassau-Weilburg.

This branch would face a similar situation only twenty years later: the Grand Duke had six daughters but no sons, and had deemed his cousins the Counts of Merenberg, issue of a morganatic marriage, illegible to inherit the throne. Instead (to the protest of the Count of Merenberg), he instituted a solution, whereby his daughters (and their male heirs) became eligible to succeed.

In 2011 the law of succession was changed to allow women to inherit the throne with equal right to men.

See also
Line of succession to the Luxembourger throne

References

Grand Dukes of Luxembourg
Luxembourg
Luxembourg
Heirs to the throne